The Monument to Nizami Ganjavi, a medieval Persian poet, is located in Baku in Nizami Square, on the intersection of Istiglaliyyat, Ahmad Javad, Azerbaijan and Islam Safarli streets.

The opening ceremony of the monument was held in April 1949. The sculptor of the monument was Fuad Abdurahmanov, People’s Artist of Azerbaijan.

The monument is a 6-meter high bronze statue installed on 9-meter high octahedral pedestal. The pedestal is of red Labrador, and elements of Azerbaijani architecture of Nizami’s epoch were used in its handling. There is an ornamental carving and faced bronze plates on the lower part of the monument. Seven plates feature scenes from Nizami's works, and one plate displays a memorial inscription.

References

1949 establishments in Azerbaijan
1949 sculptures
Buildings and structures completed in 1949
Culture in Baku
Baku
Monuments and memorials in Azerbaijan
Bronze sculptures
Statues in Baku
Statues of writers
Sculptures by Fuad Abdurahmanov